In mathematics, a P-multimagic cube is a magic cube that remains magic even if all its numbers are replaced by their k&hairsp;th powers for 1 ≤ k ≤ P.  cubes are called bimagic,  cubes are called trimagic, and  cubes tetramagic.  A  cube is said to be semi-perfect if the k&hairsp;th power cubes are perfect for 1 ≤ k < P, and the P&hairsp;th power cube is semiperfect.  If all P of the power cubes are perfect, the  cube is said to be perfect.  

The first known example of a bimagic cube was given by John Hendricks in 2000; it is a semiperfect cube of order 25 and magic constant 195325. In 2003, C. Bower discovered two semi-perfect bimagic cubes of order 16, and a perfect bimagic cube of order 32.  

MathWorld reports that only two trimagic cubes are known, discovered by C. Bower in 2003; a semiperfect cube of order 64 and a perfect cube of order 256.  It also reports that he discovered the only two known tetramagic cubes, a semiperfect cube of order 1024, and perfect cube of order 8192.

References

See also 

 Magic square
 Multimagic square

Magic squares